Alor Gajah British Graveyard
 Bukit Kiara Muslim Cemetery
 Cheras Christian Cemetery
 Jalan Ampang Muslim Cemetery
 Kuala Lumpur Chinese Cemetery
 Labuan War Cemetery
 Old Protestant Cemetery, George Town
 Taiping War Cemetery
 Taman Selatan
 Tanjung Kupang Memorial
 Jasin Melaka Cemetery

Malaysia
 
Cemeteries
Cemeteries